Norway competed at the 1998 Winter Paralympics in Nagano, Japan. 43 competitors from Norway won 40 medals including 18 gold, 9 silver and 13 bronze and finished 1st in the medal table.

See also 
 Norway at the Paralympics
 Norway at the 1998 Winter Olympics

References 

Norway at the Paralympics
1998 in Norwegian sport
Nations at the 1998 Winter Paralympics